The Elizabeth Haines House is a historic house in Sebring, Florida. It is located at 605 Summit Drive. It was built in 1928. On October 14, 1993, it was added to the U.S. National Register of Historic Places. The property is currently owned by the Lindsay-Moore family as of April 2020.

References

External links
 Highlands County listings at National Register of Historic Places
 Highlands County listings at Florida's Office of Cultural and Historical Programs

Houses in Highlands County, Florida
Houses on the National Register of Historic Places in Florida
Buildings and structures in Sebring, Florida
National Register of Historic Places in Highlands County, Florida
1927 establishments in Florida
Houses completed in 1928